Vladimír Růžička (born February 17, 1989) is a Czech professional ice hockey forward. He currently plays for HC Sparta Praha of the Czech Extraliga (ELH). He was selected by the Phoenix Coyotes in the 4th round (103rd overall) of the 2007 NHL Entry Draft.

He made his Czech Extraliga debut playing with HC Slavia Praha during the 2005–06 Czech Extraliga season.

References

External links

1989 births
Living people
Arizona Coyotes draft picks
Piráti Chomutov players
HC Slavia Praha players
HC Sparta Praha players
Czech ice hockey forwards
Sportspeople from Most (city)
Czech expatriate ice hockey people
Czech expatriate sportspeople in Austria
Expatriate ice hockey players in Austria